Dr. Bhim Bahadur Rawal commonly known as Bhim Rawal is a Nepali politician, former Deputy Prime Minister & Defence Minister of Nepal in Second Oli cabinet. He served as the Minister of Home Affairs of Nepal in Madhav Nepal cabinet. He was one of the six Deputy Prime Minister in KP Sharma Oli cabinet including Bijay Kumar Gachhadar, C. P. Mainali, Chitra Bahadur K.C., Kamal Thapa and Top Bahadur Rayamajhi which was accused of paving the way for MCC in Nepal but isn't confirmed yet, the vague accusement .

He has also served as Minister of Culture, Tourism and Civil Aviation in  Girija Prasad Koirala cabinet led by Nepali Congress from 1998 - 1999. He was taken as prospective CPN-UML chairman by his cadres during 2017 Nepalese legislative election campaign. He lost in 10th general congress of Communist Party of Nepal (Unified Marxist–Leninist) from KP Sharma Oli in chairman post gaining as low as 10% vote. since then, his political future is said to be uncertain. He was proposed by Mahadev Bajgai and Supported By Dudhkala Bista for his  Candidacy of party chairman.

On 18 July 2021, he had resigned as member of parliament stating he wanted to leave active politics. Still he took his resignation back which is his usual practice to keep sympathy of people continuously.

Personal life
Rawal was born in Achham district, Nepal. He has a wife and two sons. He obtained both master's and bachelor's degrees from the Tribhuwan University and in the 1980s became a lawyer who specialized in legal awareness for the Nepal Bar Association. He has done PhD on Political Violence and the Maoist Insurgency in Nepal.

Political career
Rawal began his political career when he began serving as Jhalanath Khanal's adviser in 1990. From 1992 to 1993 he served on the United Nations's Cambodian elections panel and later allied himself with Madhav Kumar Nepal. In 1994 he was elected into Parliament following by being its Minister for Commerce, Tourism and Civil Aviation till 1995. From 1998 to 1999 he served the same positions for second term and also was Minister of Science and Technology. In April 2008 he was Proportional representative of the 2nd Nepalese Constituent Assembly.

In 2009 he spoke at the Millennium Development Goals' meeting about least developed countries. After the meeting he addressed the Third UN Private Sector Forum regarding poverty and hunger and urged the government and various private sectors to work together in order to form economy's synergy.

In 2014 it was reported that he was injured in a Sharma Oli attack on a campaign trail at a Seti-Kathmandu liaison committee.

See also 
Achham 1 (constituency)
 Nepal Communist Party

References 

1956 births
Living people
Deputy Prime Ministers of Nepal
Government ministers of Nepal
People from Achham District
Tribhuvan University alumni
Nepal MPs 2017–2022
Nepal Communist Party (NCP) politicians
Nepal MPs 1994–1999

Members of the 1st Nepalese Constituent Assembly
Members of the 2nd Nepalese Constituent Assembly
Communist Party of Nepal (Unified Marxist–Leninist) politicians
Communist Party of Nepal (Unified Socialist) politicians